Dina Islambekova (born 10 August 2000) is a Kazakhstani boxer.

She won a medal at the 2019 AIBA Women's World Boxing Championships.

References

2000 births
Living people
AIBA Women's World Boxing Championships medalists
Kazakhstani women boxers
Heavyweight boxers
Youth and Junior World Boxing Championships medalists
21st-century Kazakhstani women